The Coon Creek Formation is a geologic formation located in western Tennessee and extreme northeast Mississippi. It is a sedimentary sandy marl deposit, Late Cretaceous (Maastrichtian) in age, about 70 million years old. The formation is known for producing mosasaurs and plesiosaurs, particularly at Coon Creek in McNairy County, Tennessee, which the formation is named for. Additionally, the formation produces many other marine invertebrates such as Turritella and the state fossil of Tennessee, the bivalve Pterotrigonia thoracica, as well as other fossils such as crabs.

Beginnings

The story of Coon Creek began near the end of the Cretaceous Period, around 71 million years ago. At that time western Tennessee, eastern Arkansas, western Kentucky, and southeast Missouri were submerged beneath the Mississippi Embayment, an extension of the Gulf of Mexico. Coon Creek was formed in shallow coastal water probably less than 100 feet deep (Russell and Parks 1975). The seafloor was heavily populated with shellfish, crabs, and lobsters. Huge plesiosaurs, marine crocodiles, sea turtles, and mosasaurs shared the waters with sharks and fierce fanged-tooth fishes.  The climate was warmer than today.  Coon Creek was semi-tropical, like present-day southern Florida (Wade 1926). Heavy waves from severe tropical storms constantly churned up shallower parts of the seafloor.

A couple of miles to the east lay a marshy lowland bordering the limestone bluffs of the Western Highland Rim of the Nashville Basin, home to duckbill and theropod dinosaurs. Sluggish rivers annually washed tons of driftwood, along with the occasional dinosaur carcass, from this heavily forested area into the bay (Russell and Parks 1975).

The Geology Of The Mississippi Embayment And Coon Creek

This thumb print-shaped bay extends roughly north-south from central Mississippi to southern Illinois. It was formed when the North American continent, driven by tectonic forces passed over a magma hotspot. The region had been weakened by rifts and faults during the breakup of Rodinia nearly 1 billion years ago.  The pressure of the hotspot caused the rifted region to rise nearly 2 km from western Kentucky to northwestern Louisiana in an arch 300 km. wide.  Millions of years of sediment were subjected to erosion and nearly all of the uplift was carried away. When the continent moved west past the hotspot, the cooled land minus the eroded 2 kilometers created a deep trough. When sea level rose nearly 500 feet, the trench was filled with seawater. The Mississippi Embayment stretched West from the Tennessee Valley to the area of Little Rock, Arkansas. It may have been 1,000 feet deep where Memphis is now. The embayment gradually filled with sand, clay, and gravel brought in by rivers on uplands to the north, east, and west (Wade 1926).

The margins of the bay teemed with marine life. Crabs, snails, lobsters, clams, scallops, whelks, nautilus, sharks, and other familiar animals lived in the warm, shallow sea, eating, reproducing, and being eaten (Sohl 1960 and 1964). Giant reptilian mosasaurs, highly ornamented cephalopods, and other less familiar sea creatures lived in the water.  Their shells, bones, carapaces, teeth, and other hard parts were constantly being buried in the sandy mud of the seafloor. The lack of distinct layering indicates that clams, shrimps, and other burrowing organisms mixed the bottom sediments. Periodic hurricanes may have brought in heavy loads of river sediment to bury the plants and animals living there. Conditions for life were ideal; the water was warm and of normal salinity (Wade 1926). Wave action ensured sufficient oxygenation for animal life.

Ancient Life

Many rivers fed into the sea bringing leaves and driftwood from the land. These served as the base of the food chain. Bacteria and other microscopic scavengers ate the decaying wood. Plankton ate the bacteria. Clams filtered the small plankton. Snails ate the clams and were eaten in turn by crabs and fish. Mosasaurs and cephalopods ate the fish and crabs.  Some organisms were swimmers or floaters, but most lived on or in the sandy mud of the sea bottom. This layer of sandy clay, bones, and shells became the Coon Creek Formation.

Fossils

Most organisms are not preserved as fossils. Unless covered quickly after death, their bodies are consumed by other animals and plants or destroyed by weather. Even the bones and shells of animals that were quickly buried after death may be later dissolved by groundwater. The clay in the sediment at Coon Creek sealed off the fragile fossils from the corrosive action of water and the hard parts of the clams, snails, crabs, and shrimps were well preserved.  Occasionally the bones of vertebrates are found, as well as the cartilaginous vertebrae of sharks. Fish scales and plant leaves are sometimes found as well (Wade 1926). The Coon Creek Formation has one of the highest densities of fossil in Eastern North America. Crustacean fossils have also been unearthed in the Coon Creek Formation as well.

Dinosaurs

As of 2016, the only known dinosaurs found in this region include the remains of indeterminate hadrosaur remains, as complete fossil skeletons of dinosaurs are a rarity in Appalachia. Sometimes the dried carcasses of dinosaurs were washed out to sea by rivers. Dinosaur bones and teeth have been found in marine deposits in Mississippi. It is possible that dinosaur bones will turn up at Coon Creek someday. The remains of at least two mosasaurs have been found.  They were not dinosaurs but large aquatic lizards that could reach lengths of up to 45 feet. They were carnivorous and would have been the top of the food chain in the Coon Creek area.

Importance

Coon Creek has been named as one of the country's top twelve fossils sites for several reasons (Noble 1996).
  
• The fossils are found in their original state.  The hard shells have not been permeated by groundwater and not replaced by minerals.

• The number of fossils is stupendous.  Many times you will literally find fossils on top of fossils. Most fossil sites require concentrated efforts to find a representative sample of the fossils.

• There is a rich diversity of animals with over 600 different species of organisms found.

• Because the Coon Creek Formation sediment is unconsolidated, it makes it very easy to collect and prepare the fossils.

Age

Geologists employ biostratigraphy, the use of index fossils, for dating sedimentary rock units like the Coon Creek. Index fossils are species of plants or animals that existed over a wide area for a geologically short period of time (Russell and Parks 1975). The cephalopod Jeletzkytes nodosus is a time-sensitive fossil found in rocks a little younger than 70.6 million years old in the western United States. Other index fossils from Coon Creek date a little older than 70.6 million years. The overlap indicates that Coon Creek sediments were probably deposited between 70 and 71 million years ago.

See also
 List of fossil sites (with link directory)
 Coon Creek Science Center

References

 Adams, S. and Adams, K., 1994, Creatures in the Coon Creek Clay: The Tennessee Conservationist, v. LX/1, January/February 1994, p. 8-13.
 Berry, Edward W., 1925, The flora of the Ripley Formation: United States Geological Survey Professional Paper 136, 94 p.
 Berry, W., and Kelley, L., 1929, The Foraminifera of the Ripley Formation on Coon Creek, Tennessee: United States National Museum Proc. 76, Art. 19, No. 2816: 20 pages.
 Brister, R. C., 1994, Bruce Wade: Tennessee's forgotten geologist: Earth Sciences History, v. 13/1, p. 47-51.
 Cushman, J., 1931, A preliminary report on the Foraminifera of Tennessee, Tennessee Geological Survey Bulletin 41: 116 pages.
 Eckert, A. W., 1963, Coon Creek's Fabulous Fossils: Science Digest, v. 53/1, p. 47-53. 
 Noble, D. R., 1996, The Story of Coon Creek: Museum News, v. 75/3, May/June 1996, p. 16-22.
 Russell, E. E. and Parks, W. S., 1975, Stratigraphy of the outcropping Upper Cretaceous, Paleocene, and Lower Eocene in Western Tennessee  including descriptions of younger Fluvial Deposits: Tennessee Geological Survey Bulletin, 76: 111 p.
 Russell, E. E., Walker, L. G., and Pruitt, G. N., 1975, Field Trip 1- Fossiliferous Silurian, Devonian, and Cretaceous Formations in the Vicinity of the Tennessee River." In Stearns, Richard G.  ed.   "Field Trips in West Tennessee: Nashville: Tennessee Division of Geology Report of Investigations 36, p 8-34.
 Sohl, N. F., 1960, Archaeogastropoda, Mesogastropoda, and Stratigraphy of the Ripley, Owl Creek, and Prairie Bluff Formations of Tennessee. United States Geological Survey Professional Paper 331-A.
 Sohl, N. F., 1964, Neogastropoda, Opistobranchia, and Basommatophora from the Ripley, Owl Creek, and Prairie Bluff Formations. United States Geological Survey Professional Paper 331-B.
 Wade, Bruce, 1926, The fauna of the Ripley Formation on Coon Creek, Tennessee: United States Geological Survey Professional Paper 137, 272 p. 
 Zepp, L., 1999, Students Dig the Past at Coon Creek: The Tennessee Conservationist, v. LXV, no. 1, January/February 1999.

External links
Coon Creek Science Center

Cretaceous geology of Tennessee
Geologic formations of Mississippi
Upper Cretaceous Series of North America
Natural history of Tennessee
Natural history of Mississippi